2009 Rally Isle of Man was held on July 9–11, 2009, the 46th Rally Isle of Man and was round 4 of the 2009 MSA British Rally Championship, round 6 of the 2009 Irish Tarmac Rally Championship and round 5 of the 2009 MSA British Historic Rally Championship.

A fifth win in the International section of the 2009 Rally Isle of Man, Mark Higgins became the most successive driver in the event with co-driver Bryan Thomas in a Subaru Impreza N11. In second place was close title rivals in the BRC Championship with Keith Cronin/Greg Shinnors from the pairing of Alastair Fisher/Rory Kennedy in third place both driving Mitsubishi Evo 9 cars.  The 2009 Historic Rally provided a seventh overall win for Dessie Nutt with co-driver Geraldine McBride with a Porsche 911.  The Post-Historic class was won by Steve Smith/John Nichols also driving a Porsche 911 and Classic section won by Gwyndaf Evans/John Nichols with a Ford Escort.  The first leg of the Isle of Man Rally Challenge was won by Matt Edward/Rob Fagg and the second leg by Ross Ford/Gary McElhinney both driving Ford Fiesta ST cars.  The 2009 Manx Trophy Rally provided the third win for local Isle of Man crew of George Collister/Janet Craine driving a Mitsubishi Evo 3 rally car.

Special stages

Results

Retirements 
International
  Jonathan Greer/Kirsty Riddick (Mitusbishi Evo 9) – Rolled (SS8);
  Molly Taylor/Jemma Bellingham (Suzuki Swift Sport) – Rolled (SS13);
  Adam Gould/Sebastian Marshall (Subaru Impreza) – Rolled (SS17);
   Matti Rantanen/Mikko Lukka (Renault Clio Ragnotti) – Accident (SS18);

2009 British Rally Championship Drivers' championship

Sources

External links
2009 Rally Isle of Man official website

Motorsport in the Isle of Man
Rally Isle of Man
Rally
Isle of Man